XHNH-FM is a radio station on 95.1 FM in Irapuato, Guanajuato. XHNH is owned by Radio Grupo Antonio Contreras and carries a classic hits format known as Stereo 95.

History
XHNH received its concession on October 14, 1976, two months after signing on August 2. It was the first FM radio station in Irapuato.

References

Radio stations in Guanajuato
Radio stations established in 1976